The Great Pamir or Big Pamir (Wakhi: Past Pamir; Kyrgyz: Chong Pamir) is a broad U-shaped grassy valley or pamir in the eastern part of the Wakhan in north-eastern Afghanistan and the adjacent part of Tajikistan, in the Pamir Mountains. Zorkol lake lies at the northern edge of the Great Pamir.

The valley is 60 km long, and is bounded to the north by the Southern Alichur Range and to the south by the Nicholas Range and the Wakhan Range.

The Great Pamir is used by Wakhi and Kyrgyz herders for summer pasture.  Side valleys support populations of Marco Polo sheep, snow leopard, ibex, and brown bear. In the past the valley was part of the Principality of Wakhan.

Pamir-i-Buzurg Wildlife Reserve
The 57,700 ha Pamir-i-Buzurg Wildlife Reserve in Afghanistan contains an area of high mountains, within which the valleys of the Abakhan, Manjulak, Sargaz and Tulibai rivers flow into the Pamir River. In the south is the wide Wakhan River valley. The reserve has been designated an Important Bird Area (IBA) by BirdLife International because it supports populations of Himalayan snowcocks, Himalayan griffons, wallcreepers, white-winged redstarts, Altai accentors, brown accentors, white-winged snowfinches, great rosefinches, plain mountain finches and Brandt's mountain finches.

References 

Valleys of Afghanistan
Valleys of Tajikistan
Wakhan
Landforms of Badakhshan Province
Important Bird Areas of Afghanistan